Lodovico De Filippis (born December 22, 1915 in Ancona) was an Italian professional football player.

1915 births
Year of death missing
Italian footballers
Serie A players
Alma Juventus Fano 1906 players
Bologna F.C. 1909 players
Juventus F.C. players
Venezia F.C. players
U.S. Triestina Calcio 1918 players
Brescia Calcio players
S.S.D. Pro Sesto players
Association football midfielders